Buddy Rich Sings Johnny Mercer is a 1956 studio album by Buddy Rich, of the lyrics of Johnny Mercer, arranged by Buddy Bregman. This was the first of three vocal albums that Rich recorded.

Track listing 
LP side A
 "Goody Goody" (Matty Malneck)
 "Out of This World" (Harold Arlen)
 "Skylark" (Hoagy Carmichael)
 "Ac-Cent-Tchu-Ate the Positive" (Arlen)
 "One for My Baby (and One More for the Road)" (Arlen)
 "Fools Rush In (Where Angels Fear to Tread)" (Bloom)
LP side B
 "Day In, Day Out" (Rube Bloom)
 "Blues in the Night" (Arlen)
 "Trav'lin' Light" (Jimmy Mundy, Trummy Young)
 "Too Marvelous for Words" (Richard A. Whiting)
 "This Time the Dream's on Me" (Arlen)
 "Dream" (Johnny Mercer)

All lyrics by Johnny Mercer, composers indicated.

Personnel 
 Harry "Sweets" Edison – trumpet
 Ted Nash – tenor saxophone
 Jimmy Rowles – piano
 Buddy Rich – vocals, drums
 Alvin Stoller – drums
 Buddy Bregman – arranger, orchestra conductor

References 

 Verve MGV 2009
 Buddy Rich Sings Johnny Mercer (Verve MGV 2009) at jazzdisco.org

1956 albums
Buddy Rich albums
Vocal jazz albums
Albums arranged by Buddy Bregman
Albums produced by Norman Granz
Verve Records albums
Albums conducted by Buddy Bregman
Johnny Mercer tribute albums